Discrete Mathematics is a biweekly peer-reviewed scientific journal in the broad area of discrete mathematics, combinatorics, graph theory, and their applications. It was established in 1971 and is published by North-Holland Publishing Company. It publishes both short notes, full length contributions, as well as survey articles. In addition, the journal publishes a number of special issues each year dedicated to a particular topic. Although originally it published articles in French and German, it now allows only English language articles. The editor-in-chief is Douglas West (University of Illinois, Urbana).

History 
The journal was established in 1971. The very first article it published was written by Paul Erdős, who went on to publish a total of 84 papers in the journal.

Abstracting and indexing 
The journal is abstracted and indexed in:

According to the Journal Citation Reports, the journal has a 2020 impact factor of 0.87.

Notable publications 

 The 1972 paper by László Lovász on the study of perfect graphs
 The 1973 short note "Acyclic orientations of graphs" by Richard Stanley on the study of the chromatic polynomial and its generalizations
 Václav Chvátal introduced graph toughness in 1973
 The 1975 paper by László Lovász on the linear programming relaxation for the set cover problem.
 The 1980 paper by Philippe Flajolet on the combinatorics of continued fractions.
 The 1985 paper by Bressoud and Zeilberger proved Andrews's q-Dyson conjecture

References

External links
 

Combinatorics journals
English-language journals
Discrete mathematics
Publications established in 1971
Elsevier academic journals
Semi-monthly journals